Kevin Ernest Williams (born March 19, 1956) is a Canadian music producer, keyboardist, audio engineer, and educational administrator with over 25 years experience within the post-secondary education system. He is the co-founder and partner of Sessionwire Communications Inc.

Early life
Williams was born in North Vancouver, British Columbia, Canada on March 19, 1956.

Hot Sole Music
In 1994, Williams started his own audio engineering school and recording studio, Hot Sole Music Inc., which he would own and manage until 2008.

Nimbus School of Recording Arts
Taking the curriculum and experience he had developed through Hot Sole, Williams partnered with Bob Ezrin and Garth Richardson to co-found Nimbus School of Recording Arts.

Sessionwire
In early 2015, Williams joined forces with Robin Leboe to co-found Sessionwire Communications Inc. Sessionwire is a synchronized music and audio collaboration platform for composers, musicians, and audio professionals on the web.

References

External links
 Sessionwire website

1956 births
Living people
Canadian record producers
Canadian keyboardists
Canadian audio engineers